This is a list of writers about the sport of cricket.

 John Arlott
 Philip Bailey
 Brian Bassano
 Richie Benaud
 Rahul Bhattacharya
 Lawrence Booth
 Dick Brittenden
 Robert Brooke
 Neville Cardus
 Stephen Chalke
 Charles Fortune
 David Frith
 Sunil Gavaskar
 Saurav Ganguly
 Ramachandra Guha
 Gideon Haigh
 Duncan Hamilton
 Alan Lee
 Bapoo Mama
 Sanjay Manjrekar
 Ronald Mason
 Sujit Mukherjee
 Don Neely
 Venkatraman Ramnarayan
 R. C. Robertson-Glasgow
 Ray Robinson
 Joseph Romanos
 Alan Ross
 Rowland Ryder
 E. W. Swanton
 The Grade Cricketer
 A. A. Thomson
 E. M. Wellings
 Bernard Whimpress
 R. S. Whitington
 John Woodcock

See also
 Bibliography of cricket

References

 
Writers
Cricket